Keezhakasakudy is a revenue village in Karaikal taluk of Karaikal district. It is located in north of the Karaikal city.

References

Villages in Karaikal district